Oracle is a census-designated place (CDP) in Pinal County, Arizona, United States. The population was 3,686 at the 2010 Census, falling to 3,051 at the 2020 Census.

Buffalo Bill Cody owned the High Jinks Gold Mine in Oracle briefly and, in 1911, appeared as "Santa" for a group of local children.  The community is the location of the Biosphere 2 experiment. Oracle was also the postal address for environmentalist author Edward Abbey, who never lived in the town but visited often.  Oracle is becoming a bedroom community for Tucson, Arizona, but large-scale development is opposed by many residents.

Oracle State Park is adjacent. The Arizona Trail passes through the Park and community.
Oracle is the gateway to the road up the north face of Mount Lemmon, which starts off of American Avenue and currently offers a secondary route to the top. Prior to the construction of the Catalina Highway on the opposite side of the Santa Catalina range, the Oracle Control Road was the only road access to the mountain community of Summerhaven. The term "control road" derives from the fact that the direction of traffic was restricted to one-way only, either up or down at alternate times of day, to prevent motorists from having to pass one another on the narrow, steep road.  This route is now popular mainly with off-road 4x4 drivers and with off-road or dual-purpose motorcyclists, and should not be attempted by regular passenger cars or street motorcycles. This road ends at the Catalina Highway near Loma Linda.

History 

The name "Oracle" comes from early prospectors.  Albert Weldon came to the area looking for gold and silver.  He and some other companions named their first mine The Oracle after the ship Weldon had traveled on.  The community was later named after its first mine, and thus, indirectly, after a ship.

The community began to grow in the late 1870s, as gold and silver were discovered, and the Christmas and New Year mines opened.  By 1880, a post office had been established.

The community also became a retreat for people suffering from tuberculosis.  The Acadia Ranch – built in Oracle in 1882 by Edwin S. and Lillian Dodge – was, during this time, a sanitorium.

On January 1, 2017, in the Arizona Daily Star newspaper, historian David Leighton challenged the accepted history of the town of Oracle:

He wrote that Albert Weldon who was born about 1840 in New Brunswick, Canada, traveled on his uncle Capt. A.D. Wood's ship Oracle around Cape Horn at the tip of South America and arrived in California between 1857 and 1860. Weldon enlisted as a private in Company E, 5th California Infantry, of the Union Army, in 1861. This unit was attached to the California Column and soon marched to Tucson where Weldon was posted at a nearby stage station before moving east and eventually being honorably discharged in Mesilla New Mexico in 1864.

After his military service he returned to California and was involved in mining and also lumber. In 1876 he returned to Arizona. Within a couple of years he found a partner in Irishman Jimmie Lee and both men traveled northeast of Tucson into the Santa Catalina Mountains in search of precious metal. Soon he found a mining claim and named it Oracle in honor of his uncle's ship.

The ship Oracle was built under the supervision of Captain Charles E. Ranlett and was constructed for the shipbuilding firm Chapman & Flint of Maine. It was launched in 1853 and was a temperance ship (one that didn't allow alcohol aboard) and sailed to ports across the globe including Melbourne, Australia and Shanghai, China.  It was captained by Weldon's uncle for several years.

Weldon was soon joined by Alexander McKay, an immigrant from Scotland who located two mining claims named Christmas and New Years because of the days they were discovered. McKay also built a one-room house, the first in the area, and from it, the village grew. When it was time for a post office to be named, Oracle was the name eventually chosen.

Mr. Leighton stated that the town of Oracle takes its name from the Oracle Mine which took its name from the ship Oracle and that he believes the ship took its name from an oraclea shrine dedicated to a particular god where people went to consult a priest or priestess in times of trouble or uncertaintycalled the Temple of Apollo at Didyma in present-day Aydin Province, Turkey, not the oracle at Delphi, Greece believed by some to be the origin of the name. He also explained that there were two ships named Oracle made by the same shipbuilder, the second one being launched in 1876 but that this later ship wasn't the boat that Weldon traveled on, as some sources have said.

Climate 

The record high temperature for Oracle was  recorded in July 1995. The record low temperature was  recorded in December 1990. Rainfall increases during July and August, due to the monsoon effect.

Vegetation includes mesquite, prickly pear, barrel cactus, saguaro, cholla, emory oak and grasses. Fauna includes javelinas, coyotes and Gambel's quail.

Geology 

Oracle and the surrounding area sit largely on a slab of granite called "Oracle granite" that is visible as red or grey-and-white speckled "boulders" rising over the scrub and grass. It is mostly porphyritic biotite Precambrian granite with large microcline phenocrysts, and has occasional inclusions of white and milky quartz and pegmatite. The granite rarely contains ore and veins of gold or silver, and sometimes copper.

Geography
Oracle is located at  (32.616030, -110.781854).

Attractions and events

 Titan Power Sports & Rentals, off-road adventures
 Acadia Ranch Museum, operated by the Oracle Historical Society, local history
 Arizona zipline Adventures
 Historic 3C Ranch
 Biosphere 2
 Oracle State Park
 GLOW, an annual nighttime multimedia art event coinciding with the full moon.
 Peppersauce Cave, a limestone cave with approximately one mile of mapped passages.
 The Tucson Marathon starts in Oracle
 YMCA Triangle Y Ranch Camp
 The sunsets during the monsoon season.

Demographics

As of the census of 2000, there were 3,563 people, 1,384 households, and 1,004 families residing in the CDP. The racial makeup of the CDP was 77.0% White or European American, 0.1% Black or African American, 1.5% Native American, 0.1% Asian, 0.2% Pacific Islander, 17.3% from other races, and 3.8% from two or more races.  38.3% of the population were Hispanic or Latino of any race.

There were 1,384 households, out of which 31.5% had children under the age of 18 living with them, 57.0% were married couples living together, 10.4% had a female householder with no spouse present, and 27.4% were non-families. 23.4% of all households were made up of individuals, and 7.4% had someone living alone who was 65 years of age or older.  The average household size was 2.6 and the average family size was 3.0.

In the CDP, the population was spread out, with 26.4% under the age of 18, 7.7% from 18 to 24, 24.6% from 25 to 44, 27.8% from 45 to 64, and 13.5% who were 65 years of age or older.  The median age was 40 years. For every 100 females, there were 97.5 males.  For every 100 females age 18 and over, there were 95.8 males.

The median income for a household in the CDP was $38,267, and the median income for a family was $46,026. Males had a median income of $37,667 versus $30,667 for females. The per capita income for the CDP was $19,459.  About 8.0% of families and 10.0% of the population were below the poverty line, including 10.8% of those under age 18 and 3.2% of those age 65 or over.

See also
 Santa Catalina Ranger District of the Coronado National Forest

References

External links

 Tourism Guide of Oracle, Arizona
 Oracle Historical Society, Acadia Ranch Museum

Census-designated places in Pinal County, Arizona
Santa Catalina Mountains
Mining communities in Arizona
1870s establishments in Arizona Territory
Populated places established in the 1870s